The Rochester Bears were a minor league baseball team that played in the Minnesota–Wisconsin League in 1911. The team was based in Rochester, Minnesota and became the Rochester Bugs for 1912.

References

Bears
Baseball teams established in 1911
1911 establishments in Minnesota
Defunct minor league baseball teams
Professional baseball teams in Minnesota
Defunct baseball teams in Minnesota
Baseball teams disestablished in 1911
Minnesota-Wisconsin League teams